Admiral Shahid Karimullah  (Urdu: شاهد كريم الله; b. 14 February 1948) was a Pakistan Navy officer who served as the Chief of Naval Staff from 2002 until 2005.

Prior to that, he also served as the Pakistan Ambassador to Saudi Arabia from 2005 until retiring from the foreign service in 2009.

Biography

Early life and naval career
Shahid Karimullah was born in Karachi, Sindh, Pakistan on 14 February 1948 to an Urdu-speaking family who belongs to Hyderabad Deccan in India but migrated to Pakistan following partition of British Indian in 1947. He comes from a military family and his father, Lieutenant-Commander Muhammad Karimullah also served in the Royal Indian Navy and later the Pakistan Navy.

After graduating from a local high school in 1963, he was admitted and studied at the famed D. J. Science College before joining the Pakistan Navy in October 1965. He was trained at the Pakistan Military Academy but later sent to United Kingdom to attend the Royal Navy's HMS Mercury where he graduated with a communication courses and gained military commission as a Midshipman in the Navy in October 1968. His S/ No. was 1126 issued by the Defence ministry and later promoted as Sub-Lieutenant in the Navy in 1971.

In 1971, he was stationed in East Pakistan and took participation in violent civil war, followed by the war with India in East. He was promoted as Lieutenant and served as commanding officer of gunboat, participating in various operations against the Indian Army and Mukti Bahini. After the surrender of Eastern Command was announced, he was subsequently taken war prisoner and was seriously wounded.  His gallantry actions won him the Sitara-e-Jurat which was given to him in 1972, following his repatriation. It took him 2 years for his full recovery before resuming his military service.

After the war, he became engage with his studies and went to the Newport in Rhode Island, United States to attend the Naval War College. He graduated from the Naval War College in master's degree in War studies and later attended the National Defence University where he graduated with another master's degree in the international relations degree.

Command and staff appointments

In the 1980s, he served as an aide-de-camp to Chairman Joint chiefs Admiral Mohammad Shariff and former Chief of Naval Staff Admiral Karamat Rahman Niazi. In 1995–96, he was promoted as Commodore and took over the command of the 25th Destroyer Squadron as its Flag Officer Commanding (FOC). He also served as Directing Staff in the War studies faculty at the National Defence University in Islamabad.

In 1997, Commodore Karimullah was posted as Director Signals but later posted for a one-star staff assignment at the Navy NHQ in Islamabad.

Commodore Karimullah was appointed as ACNS (Personnel) but later posted as DCNS (Operations) under Admiral Fasih Bokhari– the Chief of Naval Staff.  After Admiral Admiral Bokhari resigned, he was promoted as Rear-Admiral and continued to serve as DCNS (Operations) in 1999.  In 2000–01, he was promoted as Vice-Admiral and took over the command of Pakistan Fleet as its fleet commander.

Chief of Naval Staff

In 2002, Vice-Admiral Karimullah was appointed Chief of Naval Staff and was promoted to four-star admiral in the Navy before taking the post. Admiral Karimullah superseded two senior naval officers, Vice-Admiral Taj Khattak, the Vice Chief of Naval Staff (VCNS), and Vice-Admiral G.Z. Malik, the commander of Submarine fleet– both officers were much senior to him. During this time, he engaged in talks with the Chinese Navy for a technology transfer of building the modern warships in Karachi.

As a response to the Agni-I missile test in 2002, Admiral Karimullah began advocating for acquiring the nuclear navy capability but denied of deploying nuclear arsenals on the Agosta 90B submarines. Admiral Karimullah ambiguously left the option open and quoted to news media that it would do so only if "forced to."

In 2003, Admiral Karimullah again secretly pushed for the second strike capability in the government but publicly reiterated on the issue of nuclear weapons and announced that while no such immediate plans really existed, but he did stressed on the fact Pakistan would not hesitate to take such steps if it felt so compelled. He remained concerns of expansion of Indian Navy in the region and continued his secret push for acquiring of the modern weapon systems for the Navy.

In 2004, he successfully negotiated with the U.S. Navy to induct the Navy in the combined maritime force to provide cooperation in regional maritime and security affair. Admiral Shahid Karimullah was notably bypassed by President Pervez Musharraf for the chairmanship for the Joint Chiefs of Staff Committee in October 2004. Admiral Karimullah was the most senior-most four-star rank officer in the Pakistani military and was controversially superseded by the junior-most army general, Lieutenant-General Ehsan ul Haq.

In 2005, he began pushing and vigorously lobbying in the government for the extension of Pakistan's seaborne border from 200 to 350 nautical miles for which the claim is to be submitted by May 2009 in accordance with provisions of UN Conventions on Laws of Seas of 1982. It was in 2015 when the borders were extended which pushed Pakistan's area of sea border to 50,000 square kilometres.

Admiral Karimullah retired from the Navy in 2005 and handed over the command of the Navy to Admiral Afzal Tahir who also superseded Vice-Admiral Mohammad Haroon by President Musharraf.

Ambassador to Saudi Arabia

Having by-passed as Chairman joint chiefs post, President Musharraf announced to appoint Admiral Karimullah for a diplomatic post and appointed him as Pakistan Ambassador to Saudi Arabia. In 2009, he left the post once completing his tenure and returned to Karachi, Sindh, Pakistan.

Honors and post retirement

Admiral Karimullah is a recipient of Nishan-e-Imtiaz (military), Sitara-i-Imtiaz (military), and Hilal-i-Imtiaz (military)that were decorated to him during his military service.

He was also decorated with the Legion of Merit by the United States, presented to him by US Navy's CNO Admiral Vern Clark in 2004. In 2005, he was conferred with French Legion d'Honneur for promoting Pakistan-Franco naval collaboration in various fields at different posts he held during his service career, including induction of French submarines and aircraft in Pakistan Navy.

On 21 September 2005, Admiral Karimullah was awarded with the Honorary Malaysian Armed Forces Order for Valor award as a Gallant Commander in acknowledgment of his long meritorious services.

After retiring from the foreign service, he apparently joined the "Progress", a public service think tank, and serves on its advisory board. He also remained chairman of Karachi Council on Foreign Relations for some time.

About the Fall of Dhaka in 1971, Admiral Karimullah reportedly was of the view that: History is there to earn lessons from but unfortunately this did not happening in Pakistan". He also remained associate with the Bahria University in Karachi and reportedly maintained in favor of CPEC developmental projects in the country.

Awards and decorations

Foreign Decorations

See also 
Indian immigration to Pakistan
Urdu–speaking people
 Hyderabadi culture in Pakistan
 Hyderabadi Muslims
 Golkonda
 Hyderabad State
 India
 History of Hyderabad for a history of the city of Hyderabad.
 Hyderabad (India) for the city.

References

External links

Admiral Shahid Karimullah takes over as Navy chief
Profile of Shahid Karimullah
Karimullah new Naval chief

 

1948 births
Military personnel from Hyderabad, India
People from Karachi
Pakistan Military Academy alumni
Pakistani military personnel of the Indo-Pakistani War of 1971
Pakistani prisoners of war
Naval War College alumni
National Defence University, Pakistan alumni
Academic staff of the National Defence University, Pakistan
Pakistan Navy admirals
Chiefs of Naval Staff (Pakistan)
Ambassadors of Pakistan to Saudi Arabia
Recipients of the Legion of Honour
Recipients of Sitara-e-Jurat
Recipients of Sitara-i-Imtiaz
Recipients of Hilal-i-Imtiaz
Recipients of Nishan-e-Imtiaz
Foreign recipients of the Legion of Merit
Living people
Pakistani people of Hyderabadi descent
D. J. Sindh Government Science College alumni